The 1959 Portuguese Grand Prix was a Formula One motor race held at Monsanto on 23 August 1959. It was race 7 of 9 in the 1959 World Championship of Drivers and race 6 of 8 in the 1959 International Cup for Formula One Manufacturers. It was the eighth Portuguese Grand Prix and the second to be held for the Formula One World Drivers' Championship. It was the third time the race was held at Monsanto and the first for Formula One. The race was held over 62 laps of the five kilometre circuit for a total race distance of 337 kilometres.

The race was won by British driver Stirling Moss, his eleventh Grand Prix victory, driving a Cooper T51 for privateer race team Rob Walker Racing Team. Moss finished a lap ahead of American racer Masten Gregory driving a similar Cooper T51 for the factory Cooper Car Company team. American Scuderia Ferrari driver Dan Gurney finished third in his Ferrari Dino 246.

Race report 

Wins in France and Germany had given Tony Brooks a healthy second place in the championship behind Jack Brabham. Stirling Moss improved on his poor championship position with a dominating drive, lapping the entire field. Phil Hill and Graham Hill crashed into each other on lap 6, whilst Brabham had an enormous somersaulting crash from which he emerged unscathed. Gurney was the only Ferrari in the top eight with Maurice Trintignant and Harry Schell rounding off the top five.

With Brabham failing to finish and Brooks finishing a distant five laps down in ninth, Moss closed the gap to just 9½ points behind Brabham and 5½ points behind Brooks in the championship race.

Classification

Qualifying

Race 

Notes
 – Includes 1 point for fastest lap

Championship standings after the race

Drivers' Championship standings

Constructors' Championship standings

 Notes: Only the top five positions are included for both sets of standings. Only the best 5 results counted towards each Championship. Numbers without parentheses are Championship points; numbers in parentheses are total points scored.

References

Portuguese Grand Prix
Portuguese Grand Prix
Portuguese Grand Prix